Alena Matoshka (born 23 June 1982) is a Belarusian hammer thrower. She competed in the hammer throw event at the 2012 Summer Olympics finishing in 7th place. In 2019 the IOC disqualified her from the 2012 Olympic Games for failing a drugs test in a re-analysis of her doping sample from 2012.

References

1982 births
Living people
Belarusian female hammer throwers
Belarusian sportspeople in doping cases
Olympic athletes of Belarus
Athletes (track and field) at the 2012 Summer Olympics
Doping cases in athletics